Roch-Moïse-Samuel Mignault (February 5, 1837 – March 26, 1913) was a physician and political figure in Quebec. He represented Yamaska in the House of Commons of Canada from 1891 to 1904 as a Liberal member.

He was born in Montreal, Lower Canada and educated at the Collège de L'Assomption. Mignault was mayor of Yamaska and also served as justice of the peace. Mignault was an unsuccessful candidate for a seat in the House of Commons in 1872 and 1887.

References 
 
The Canadian parliamentary companion, 1891, AJ Gemmill

1837 births
1913 deaths
Members of the House of Commons of Canada from Quebec
Liberal Party of Canada MPs
Mayors of places in Quebec
Canadian justices of the peace